Werner Scheurmann (born 27 September 1909, date of death unknown) was a Swiss field handball player who competed in the 1936 Summer Olympics. He was part of the Swiss field handball team, which won the bronze medal. He played in one match.

External links
Werner Scheurmann's profile at databaseOlympics.com
Werner Scheurmann's profile at Sports Reference.com

1909 births
Year of death missing
Field handball players at the 1936 Summer Olympics
Olympic bronze medalists for Switzerland
Olympic handball players of Switzerland
Swiss male handball players
Olympic medalists in handball
Medalists at the 1936 Summer Olympics